Kiribath is a traditional Sri Lankan dish made from rice. It is prepared by cooking rice with coconut milk, hence this name, and can be considered a form of rice cake or rice pudding. Kiribath is an essential dish in Sri Lankan cuisine. It is very commonly served for breakfast on the first day of each month and also has added significance of being eaten for any auspicious moment throughout one's lifetime which are marking times of transition. It is one of the more renowned traditional dishes in Sri Lanka.

Etymology
The word is a compound with a transparent meaning in the Sinhala language, where Kiri (කිරි) means "milk" and bath ( බත්) means "rice".

History

The origins of kiribath are not clear, although the dish seems to be unique to Sri Lanka.

It is said that Sujata offered kiribath to Gautama Buddha whilst he was meditating under the bodhi tree, just before attaining enlightenment.

Occasions
In a Sinhalese home, and during Sinhalese holidays and ceremonies kiribath plays a significant role. The dish celebrates festive or auspicious occasions and symbolises the beginning of new pursuits or transitions in life. Traditionally it is also eaten by families on the first day of each month.

New Year
Kiribath has a very important role for the Sinhalese in celebrating the Sinhalese New Year where it will be consumed as the first meal of the year. At the dawn of the new year, a hearth within the household is lit by the lady of the house and the traditional pot of kiribath is boiled. Sometimes rice that has been kept especially for this occasion will be used, as this occasion requires the best rice, which is expressed in terms of taste. When the cooking is finished, after a series of observances and rituals the family begins to eat, but not before making an offering to the Buddha and gods first. The family will eat from the same rice, as if they are symbolically dining together with the Buddha and the deities. During the Sinhalese New Year, or on any other special occasion, kiribath will be served as the main dish and centrepiece of the meal. At the table, kiribath is served alongside traditional sweets like Kevum, Kokis, bananas and many other delicacies. After this, the oil lamp is lit and the first meal of the year commences. The kiribath symbolises life and so it is fed to the rest of the family by the head of the family, either the father or the mother, to their progenitors for the New Year.

Feeding ceremony
Kiribath is traditionally the first solid food fed to an infant.

Weddings
Kiribath is fed by bridegrooms to brides at their wedding.

Ingredients and preparation

Ingredients
Kiribath is typically prepared from four basic components: white short-grain rice, thick coconut milk or basic milk, water and salt to taste.

Choosing the right variety of rice is critical in cooking the dish well. Long-grain rice or medium-grain rice are not the best choices for making this dish. Traditionally, it is prepared with a rice variety known as rathu haal or rathu kakulu haal for its neutral flavour and good cooking qualities. Any starchy and sticky rice variety works best. For the rice to set properly, the texture of the cooked rice is very important. Due to some difficult to source the Sri Lankan rice variety in the southern parts of Sri Lanka, the locals might use the red rice.

Preparation
The recipe for kiribath is fairly simple. The rice is cooked in boiling water for about fifteen minutes, the coconut milk is added and cooked again until the liquid is absorbed. Salt is also added when cooking. However, there are some variations to this where different ingredients are added, such as sesame seeds or cashew. 
The common method of serving Kiribath is once it has cooled and set on a plate, it is compressed and cut into diamond or square shaped blocks.

Historically kiribath had been cooked in earthen clay pots in firewood hearths; this cooking method would impart a unique flavour to the dish.

Consumption
Kiribath is usually served with lunumiris, a relish made of red onions, mixed with chili flakes, Maldive fish, salt, and lime. It can also be consumed with seeni sambol, jaggery and bananas.

Although served onto the plate with a spoon, kiribath is traditionally eaten by hand as it is the best way to mix with the lunumiris.

Variations
There are variations of kiribath including:

Mung kiribath
Mung kiribath is a variation of Kiribath is made by adding boiled green gram to the milk rice. The same recipe and procedure can be followed to make this variation. It is often prepared in Buddhist temples.

Imbul kiribath
Imbul kiribath is a sweet variation of the original. It is made by taking a small amount of milk rice, made in the regular process, and spreading it on a banana leaf. A sweet filling made of coconut and jaggery, called Pani pol, is placed in the center. The banana leaf is folded and rolled vertically and pressed firm giving it its unusual cylindrical shape.

See also
 Osechi
 Rice and curry
 No htamin

References

External links

 Youtube: Kiribath & Lunu Miris - UYAMU - YAMU TV

Sri Lankan rice dishes
Rice dishes
Foods containing coconut
Sinhalese New Year foods
Ceremonial food and drink